Bicycle Playing Cards is a brand of playing cards. Since 1885, the Bicycle brand has been manufactured by the United States Printing Company, which, in 1894, became the United States Playing Card Company (USPCC), now based in Erlanger, Kentucky. "Bicycle" is a trademark of that company. The name Bicycle was chosen to reflect the popularity of the bicycle at the end of the 19th century.

Design
Bicycle cards follow the pattern of the French deck, containing 52 cards (13 in each of two red and two black suits), and include two jokers. The Bicycle trademark is printed on the ace of spades. Current decks contain two information/instruction cards as well.

Bicycle playing cards are sold in a variety of designs, the most popular being the Rider Back design. They are available with standard indexes in poker size, bridge size, and pinochle decks, "Jumbo Index" poker decks and Lo Vision cards that are designed for the visually impaired. Other types of cards with varying backs, sizes, colors and custom designs are produced for magic tricks and as novelty and collectors' items.

Significance in American wars

Toward the end of the World War I, the United States Playing Card Company produced four "War Series" decks under the Bicycle brand to represent each of the branches of the U.S. armed services: Flying Ace for the Aviation Section of the Signal Corps, Dreadnaught for the Navy, Invincible (aka Conqueror) for the Marine Corps, and Big Gun for the Army. The decks were printed in 1917, and apparently only given an extremely limited release before being withdrawn from circulation. It is unknown why the decks were not circulated, but one theory is that they were intended to be distributed to the troops overseas, and USPCC destroyed their inventory of the War Decks when Armistice was declared in 1918. Only a handful of these decks exist today.

During World War II, cards were produced that could be peeled apart when submerged in water. Portions of a large map could be drawn on the inside surfaces, and the halves were then reassembled to form an innocuous-looking deck. These cards were supplied to POWs for use in escapes. At least one example of such a deck is known to exist, and is on display at the International Spy Museum in Washington, DC. Modern reproductions have been sold in limited editions.

The company provided crates of Ace of Spades cards for U.S. soldiers in the Vietnam War. It was erroneously believed that the Viet Cong regarded this particular card as a symbol of death and would flee at the sight of it. In actuality, it initially meant nothing to the Viet Cong, but the belief that the enemy was afraid of the cards improved the U.S. soldiers' morale. The origin of the cards is attributed to a letter written by a Lt. Charles W. Brown in early 1966 to Allison F. Stanley, the President of the United States Playing Card Company. Brown had read remarks from Congressman Craig Hosmer of California that the Viet Cong held superstitions of bad luck with pictures of women and the Ace of Spades. The Bicycle design of this card featured an image of the Goddess of Liberty combined with the spade. Upon conferring with other lieutenants, Brown asked for 1,000 Aces of Spades for his company to leave for the enemy to find, as an indication that American troops had been in the area. Stanley was sympathetic to the soldiers and pulled cards from the production line to send free of charge. The story was reported by several news outlets, including the Stars and Stripes; as a result, more units began to request cards. The symbol was eventually included in the official psychological warfare operations, and thousands of special decks containing only Aces of Spades were donated by the card company to soldiers that purposely scattered them throughout the jungle and villages during raids. Similar cards were produced during the Gulf War in 1991, immediately prior to the invasion of Iraq by US forces. Due to the short duration of the conflict, these cards never saw battle.

References

External links
 

American brands
Products introduced in 1885
1885 establishments in the United States
Playing cards